Dasht-e Bal or Dasht Bal may refer to:
 Dasht Bal, Fars
 Dasht-e Bal, Isfahan